Mylossoma aureum is a species of serrasalmid native to the Amazon and Orinoco Basins in South America. This species is of some importance to local commercial fisheries, but less so than the closely related M. albiscopum of the same region. It is a fast breeder and rapidly reaches adulthood. It breeds in whiterwater rivers and associated wetlands. It is omnivorous, but mostly feed on plant material.

References

Serrasalmidae
Taxa named by Johann Baptist von Spix
Taxa_named_by_Louis_Agassiz
Fish described in 1829